Chandrakona Assembly constituency is an assembly constituency in Paschim Medinipur district in the Indian state of West Bengal. It is reserved for scheduled castes.

Overview
As per orders of the Delimitation Commission, No. 232 Chandrakona Assembly constituency (SC) is composed of the following: Chandrakona municipality, Chandrakona I & II community development blocks, Ramjibanpur municipality, Khirpai municipality, and Niz Narajol gram panchayat of Daspur I community development block.

Chadrakona Assembly constituency (SC) is part of No. 29 Arambagh (Lok Sabha constituency) (SC).

Election results

2021

2016

2011

  

.# Swing calculated on Congress+Trinamool Congress vote percentages taken together in 2006.

1977-2006
In the 2006, 2001 and 1996 state assembly elections, Gurupada Dutta of CPI(M) won the 196 Chandrakona assembly seat defeating Lakshmipriya Mondal of Trinamool Congress  in 2006, Prabir Kushari of Trinamool Congress in 2001, and Maloy Bhattacharya of Congress in 1996. Contests in most years were multi cornered but only winners and runners are being mentioned. Umapati Chakraborty of CPI(M) defeated Satya Ghosal of UCPI in 1991, Sk. Khalilur Rahaman of Congress in 1987, Satya Ghosal, Independent, in 1982, and Jagannath Goswami of Congress in 1977.

1962-1972
Satya Ghoshal of CPI won in 1972. Soroshi Choudhury of CPI(M) won in 1971 and 1969. Indrajit Roy of Congress won in 1967 and 1962.

References

Assembly constituencies of West Bengal
Politics of Paschim Medinipur district